Ganzorigiin Mandakhnaran (born 11 May 1986) is a male Mongolian wrestler who competes in the 66 kg category in freestyle wrestling. He was born in Tuv province of Mongolia. He is a two-time world bronze medalist and Ivan Yarygin 2016 contestant.

He reached 5th place in the 2016 Summer Olympics in Rio de Janeiro after he was denied victory for running away from his opponent in the last seconds of their bronze medal contest. Mandakhnaran almost won bronze in the 65 kg event but in the final seconds when he was leading 7–6, he started prematurely celebrating in front of his opponent – Ikhtiyor Navruzov. A penalty point was awarded to Navruzov by the judges due to Mandakhnaran refusing to engage with his opponent during the round. Mandakhnaran's coach and trainer were so incensed by the decision that they took off their clothes in front of the judges, leading to another point being awarded to Navruzov for a final score of 7–8 with Navruzov becoming the victor.  Both of his coaches would later be banned by the United World Wrestling until August 2019.

References

External links
 
 The Facebook profile 

Asian Games medalists in wrestling
Wrestlers at the 2010 Asian Games
1986 births
Living people
People from Töv Province
World Wrestling Championships medalists
Mongolian male sport wrestlers
Asian Games gold medalists for Mongolia
Wrestlers at the 2016 Summer Olympics

Medalists at the 2010 Asian Games
Universiade medalists in wrestling
Wrestlers at the 2018 Asian Games
Universiade bronze medalists for Mongolia
Olympic wrestlers of Mongolia
Medalists at the 2013 Summer Universiade
Asian Wrestling Championships medalists
20th-century Mongolian people
21st-century Mongolian people